Wild Turkey Strand Preserve is a  3,137 acre area of protected lands in Lee County, Florida. The preserve is off State Route south of Lehigh Acres. It includes part of the former Buckingham Army Airfield, a World War II-era training base.

The preserve includes flatwoods, cypress strand swamps, cypress dome swamps, freshwater marshes, wet prairies, and abandoned agricultural pasture. There is a 1.8 mile trail with boardwalks and interpretive signage. The preserve lands were acquired during the first decade of the 21st century.

References

External links
Preserve website
Preserve trailmap
Brochure

Protected areas of Lee County, Florida